Protein AMBP is a protein that in humans is encoded by the AMBP gene.

Interactions 

Alpha-1-microglobulin/bikunin precursor has been shown to interact with CD79A.

See also 
 Inter-alpha-trypsin inhibitor
 Alpha-1-microglobulin

References

Further reading

External links 
 The MEROPS online database for peptidases and their inhibitors: LI02-001

Precursor proteins
Lipocalins